Charles VIII may refer to:

 Charles VIII of Sweden (1409–1470), Charles II of Sweden, Charles I of Norway
 Charles VIII of France (1470–1498), "the Affable"
 Carlos VIII (disambiguation), regnal name of two claimants to the Spanish throne

See also 
 King Charles (disambiguation)
 Charles